Michael Lynch (25 August 1934 – 21 May 2019) was a Fianna Fáil politician from County Meath in Ireland. He served two terms as a Teachta Dála (TD) in the 1980s, and was a Senator for four years.

Lynch stood unsuccessfully as a Fianna Fáil candidate for Dáil Éireann for the Meath constituency at the 1977 and 1981 general elections, before winning a seat there at the February 1982 general election. He was defeated at the November 1982 general election, but was then elected to the 17th Seanad Éireann on the Administrative Panel.

He was returned to the Dáil at the 1987 general election, but after a further defeat at the 1989 general election (by his Fianna Fáil colleague Mary Wallace) he did not stand for the Dáil again. He was also unsuccessful in the 1993 elections to the 20th Seanad.

He was a long-serving member of Meath County Council for the Kells electoral Area for many years, ultimately retiring at the 2009 local elections.

Lynch owned and ran the Ceili House pub in Oldcastle. 

He died on 21 May 2019, aged 84.

References

1934 births
2019 deaths
Fianna Fáil TDs
Members of the 23rd Dáil
Members of the 17th Seanad
Members of the 25th Dáil
Local councillors in County Meath
Politicians from County Meath
Fianna Fáil senators